Myosin-15 also known as myosin, heavy chain 15 is a protein that in humans is encoded by the MYH15 gene.

Function 

MYH15 is a slow-twitch myosin.

References

Further reading